Count Morzin (Karl Joseph, Count Morzin) was an aristocrat of the Holy Roman Empire during the 18th century. He is remembered today as the first person to employ the composer Joseph Haydn as his Kapellmeister, or music director. The first few of Haydn's many symphonies were written for the Count.

Biography 

Different authorities give a different interpretation to the phrase "Count Morzin" (the sole words by which early Haydn biographies identified the man); the phrase is ambiguous because the title of count was hereditary, so that there was a whole line of Counts Morzin. The New Grove (article by James Webster) asserts that the "Count Morzin" who played an important role in Haydn's life was Karl Joseph Franz Morzin (1717–1783), whereas a biography by the leading Haydn scholar H. C. Robbins Landon asserts that it was Ferdinand Maximilan Franz Morzin' (1693–1763). The difference apparently involves the question of whether Haydn was hired by the reigning count (Ferdinand Maximilian) or his son (Karl Joseph); see External Link below.

Joseph Haydn
The date of Haydn's appointment is also uncertain; it was in 1757. The appointment ended a period of struggle and economic insecurity for the composer, during which time he had worked as a freelance, gradually increasing his reputation and his connections with the aristocracy. Haydn's biographer Georg August Griesinger (1810), who interviewed the composer in his old age, wrote:

In the year 1759 Haydn was appointed in Vienna to be music director to Count Morzin with a salary of two hundred gulden, free room, and board at the staff table. Here he enjoyed at last the good fortune of a care-free existence; it suited him thoroughly. The winter was spent in Vienna and the summer in Bohemia, in the vicinity of Pilsen.

This migratory pattern was characteristic of aristocracy in Haydn's day: summers on their hereditary estates in the provinces, winters in the fashionable capital. Robbins Landon, writing in 1988, adds "the castle, which still stands, is now used as a mental hospital." Jones (2009) says of the castle that is "still survives, though now empty and in a state of decay."

Haydn wrote, approximately, his first fifteen symphonies for Count Morzin. Evidence from copied parts made for Baron Karl Joseph Weber von Fürnberg (an earlier Haydn employer) leads Robbins Landon to conjecture that the Count's orchestra consisted of "at least six, possibly eight violins ... while in the basso section there were at least one cello, one bassoon and one double bass (violone). There was also a wind-band sextet (oboes, bassoons, and horns).". Thus, the orchestra was much smaller than orchestras for which Haydn wrote later on in his career (which ranged in size up to about 60), let alone a modern symphonic ensemble.

While in Vienna, the Morzin ensemble was evidently part of a lively musical scene, sponsored by the aristocracy. Haydn's contemporary biographer Giuseppe Carpani (whose testimony is not always trusted by musicologists) wrote the following concerning Count Harrach, who was the patron of Haydn's own birth village of Rohrau:

Count Harrach ... was the first to bring the music of Sammartini to Vienna, where it quickly won applause and became the vogue in that great capital so enamored of this kind of diversion. Count Pálffy, ... Count Schönborn and Count Morzin vied with one another in procuring novelties for display in their almost daily concerts.

It was while Haydn was working for Count Morzin that he was married (17 November 1760) Anna Maria Keller, despite the fact that his contract forbade him to marry. The marriage, which lasted until Mrs. Haydn's death in 1800, was an unhappy one.

The end of Haydn's appointment with Morzin is narrated by another early biographer, Albert Christoph Dies (1810):

A year passed without Count Morzin's knowing of the marriage of his Kapellmeister, but something else came up to alter Haydn's situation. The Count found himself obliged to reduce his heretofore great expenditures. He dismissed his musicians and so Haydn lost his post as Kapellmeister.

Meanwhile Haydn had the great recommendation of a public reputation; his amiable character was known; Count Morzin was moved to be useful on his behalf--three circumstances that combined so fortunately that Haydn soon after he ceased to be Kapellmeister to Count Morzin (1760) was taken on as Vicekapellmeister ... in the service of Prince Anton Esterházy ... at Eisenstadt, with a salary of 400 florins.

In fact, since Haydn was Kapellmeister at Eisenstadt in all but name, the incumbent Kapellmeister being infirm, the move to the Esterházy family was a big career advance for him, and he continued there in the same general line of work, as composer, conductor, and administrator, but working for a far wealthier family.

The Haydn symphonies written for Count Morzin 

Establishing just which of the Haydn symphonies were written for the Morzin orchestra is partly a matter of conjecture. Haydn scholar James Webster, following earlier research and his own efforts, produced the following list: 1, 2, 4, 5, 10, 11, 18, 27, 32, 37, A, which was used in determining the contents of the opening "Morzin" volume for Christopher Hogwood's recording of the Haydn symphonies. A second volume of roughly equal length consists of symphonies that may have been composed for Morzin, though they equally well could have been composed for the Esterházy family.  An earlier conjecture for which symphonies were written for Count Morzin was made by H. C. Robbins Landon, specifically numbers 1, 37, 18, 19, 2, B, 16, 17, 15, 4, 10, 32, 5, 11, 33, 27, A, 3, and 20.

Notes

References 
 Kapsa, Vaclav (2012) Account books, names and music: Count Wenzel von Morzin’s Virtuosissima Orchestra. Early music 40, 2012, p. 605–620, doi:10.1093/em/cas130. 
 Dies, Albert Christoph (1810) Biographical Accounts of Joseph Haydn, Vienna. English translation by Vernon Gotwals, in Gotwals (1968).
 Gotwals, Vernon (1968) Haydn: Two Contemporary Portraits, Milwaukee: University of Wisconsin Press.
 Griesinger, Georg August (1810) Biographical Notes Concerning Joseph Haydn. Leipzig: Breitkopf und Härtel. English translation by Vernon Gotwals, in Gotwals (1968).
Jones, David Wyn (2009) Oxford Composer Companions:  Haydn.  Oxford:  Oxford University Press.
 Robbins Landon, H.C. and David Wyn Jones (1988) Haydn: His Life and Music, Thames and Hudson. Biography chapters by Robbins Landon, analysis and appreciation of the works by Jones.
 Webster, James, and Georg Feder (2001), "Joseph Haydn", article in The New Grove Dictionary of Music and Musicians (New York: Grove, 2001). Published separately as a book: The New Grove Haydn (New York: Macmillan 2002). Webster is the author of the biographical section and Feder the compiler of the catalog of works.
 Webster, James. Program notes to the series of Haydn symphonies conducted by Christopher Hogwood, issued on Oiseau-Lyre; Volumes 1 and 2.

External links
Website of the municipality of Dolní Lukavice

Morzin, Count
Morzin, Count
Morzin, Count